This is a list of Australian television-related events in 1977.

Events
21 January – Golden West Network is launched in Geraldton as GTW-11 and begins broadcasting. This completes the roll-out of regional commercial television across Australia .
April – The ABC's long-running music program Countdown celebrates its 100th episode.
April – The Seven Network successfully bids for exclusive Australian rights to televise the 1980 Olympic Games from Moscow. The network paid $1 million in the deal, outbidding rival offers from ABC and Nine Network.
1 April – British sitcom Fawlty Towers debuts on ABC.
26 May – Australian satirical radio and television sketch show The Naked Vicar Show premieres on Seven Network.
October - Nine Network's wartime period soap opera, The Sullivans, premieres on British television when the ITV network begin showing it during daytime. It eventually becomes a regional programme, with each ITV contractor showing it as and when they wished. The most common timeslot used, however, was 12:30-13:00pm on Tuesday and Thursday. The series marks the first of several Australian soap operas to be broadcast by ITV, which continued until the early 00s.
5 December – The final episode of the Australian music series Flashez airs on ABC at 5:30pm.
6 December – The 0-10 Network screens Australian soap opera The Restless Years.
23 December – ABC televises the final episode of its Australian soap opera Bellbird.
Seven Network televises the VFL Grand Final live to Melbourne for the first time.
The Federal Government investigates a proposal to establish a domestic satellite system, enabling instant transmission of television and other communications across Australia and in particular to remote areas.
Australian music series Flashez returns for a new series on ABC now airing at 5:30pm right after Sesame Street for most of the year.
Gus the Snail (a character who was based on an executive producer who wanted to take over the ABC) makes his very first appearance on the long running Australian children's television series Mr. Squiggle and Friends.

Debuts

New International Programming
25 January –  Alice (The 0-10 Network)
27 January –  Serpico (Seven Network)
31 January –  Charlie's Angels (Nine Network)
2 February/23 June –  The Gemini Man (2 February: Nine Network - Melbourne, 23 June: Nine Network - Sydney)
3 February –  The Good Life (1975) (ABC)
4 February –  Executive Suite (Seven Network)
5 February –  Baa Baa Black Sheep (Nine Network)
8 February –  George and Mildred (ABC)
16 February –  The New Avengers (ABC)
18 February –  Poldark (The 0-10 Network)
12 March –  Holmes & Yoyo (Seven Network)
1 April –  Fawlty Towers (ABC)
8 April –  Jabberjaw (Nine Network)
15 May –  Simon in the Land of Chalk Drawings (ABC)
28 May –  Code R (The 0-10 Network)
17 July –  Tofffsy (ABC)
20 July –  Roobarb (ABC)
29 July – / The Muppet Show (Seven Network)
6 August –  One Day at a Time (Seven Network)
15 August –  Seventh Avenue (Seven Network)
18 September –  Wheelie and the Chopper Bunch (ABC)
31 October –  Mr. T and Tina (The 0-10 Network)
8 November –  The Andros Targets (The 0-10 Network)
9 November –  Hunter (Seven Network)
10 November –  The Jeffersons (The 0-10 Network)
12 November –  Eight is Enough (Seven Network)
18 November –  Hunter's Gold (Seven Network)
1 December –  Oh No, It's Selwyn Froggitt! (ABC)
3 December –  The Secret of Isis (Nine Network)
5 December –  Gibbsville (Seven Network)
7 December –  Ball Four (The 0-10 Network)
27 December –  Last of the Summer Wine (ABC)

Television shows

1950s
Mr. Squiggle and Friends (1959–1999).

1960s
Four Corners (1961–present).
It's Academic (1968–1978).

1970s
Hey Hey It's Saturday (1971–1999, 2009– 2010).
Young Talent Time (1971–1988).
A Current Affair (1971–1978).
Countdown (1974–1987).
The Don Lane Show (1975–1983).
This Is Your Life (1975–1980).
Flashez (1976–1977).
In the Wild (1976–1981).
Bluey (1976–1977).
The Naked Vicar Show (1977–1978).
Glenview High (1977–1979).

Ending this year

See also
 1977 in Australia
 List of Australian films of 1977

References